Aristolochia labiata, the mottled Dutchman's pipe or rooster flower, is an ornamental plant which is native to Brazil.

References

External links

labiata
Flora of Brazil